Charles Stewart Voorhees (June 4, 1853 – December 26, 1909) was an American lawyer and a two-term delegate to the U.S. Congress from the Territory of Washington.

Biography
Voorhees was born in Covington, Indiana on June 4, 1853, a son of Anna Hardesty Voorhees and  Daniel Wolsey Voorhees, who served in the U.S. House and U.S. Senate from Indiana. He attended Wabash College in Crawfordsville, Indiana, and in 1873 he graduated from Georgetown College in Washington, D.C., June 26, 1873.

After graduating from college, Voorhees studied law. He attained admission to the bar in 1875 and commenced practice in Terre Haute, Indiana. In 1882, Voorhees moved to Washington Territory with his friend John L. Wilson, and settled in Colfax to establish a law practice. From 1882 to 1886 he served as prosecuting attorney of Whitman County.

A Democrat, in 1884 Voorhees was elected as Washington's territorial delegate. He was reelected in 1886 and served in the 49th and 50th Congresses (March 4, 1885 – March 3, 1889). During the 50th Congress, the U.S. House and Senate passed the Enabling Act of 1889, which provided the process for Washington Territory to achieve statehood.

In 1888, Voorhees lost reelection to Republican John B. Allen, who served as delegate until Washington joined the Union as a state in November 1889. After leaving Congress, Voorhees resumed the practice of law in Colfax. He later moved to Spokane, where he continued the practice law. He died in Spokane on December 26, 1909. Voorhees was buried at Greenwood Cemetery in Spokane.

Family
In 1888, Voorhees married Frances "Fanny" Belle Vajen, the daughter of a prominent Indianapolis businessman. They were the parents of a daughter, Anna Belle.

References

External links

1853 births
1909 deaths
Delegates to the United States House of Representatives from Washington Territory
Washington (state) Democrats
People from Covington, Indiana
Politicians from Terre Haute, Indiana
People from Colfax, Washington
Politicians from Spokane, Washington
19th-century American politicians
Lawyers from Spokane, Washington
 Georgetown College (Georgetown University) alumni